Mitzpe Eshtemoa is an Israeli outpost in the West Bank. Located to the north of Shim'a, it falls under the jurisdiction of Har Hevron Regional Council. It was established in early 2003 and named after the nearby biblical site of Eshtemoa (Joshua 15:50; 21:14).

The international community considers Israeli settlements in the West Bank illegal under international law, but the Israeli government disputes this.

References

External links
Mitzpe Eshtemoa Peace Now

Israeli settlements in the West Bank
Populated places established in 2003
Israeli outposts